Celerena is a genus of moths in the family Geometridae.

Species
 Celerena andamana Felder & Rogenhofer
 Celerena divisa (Walker, 1862)
 Celerena griseofusa Warren, 1896
 Celerena lerne (Boisduval, 1832)
 Celerena mutata Walker, [1865]
 Celerena pallidicolor Warren, 1894
 Celerena perithea (Cramer, [1777])
 Celerena recurvata (Walker, [1865])
 Celerena signata Warren, 1898
 Celerena stenospila Warren, 1894

References
 Celerena at Markku Savela's Lepidoptera and Some Other Life Forms
 Natural History Museum Lepidoptera genus database

Desmobathrinae
Geometridae genera